Stadio Comunale Pietro Barbetti, is a multi-purpose stadium in Gubbio, Italy.  It is mainly used mostly for football matches and hosts the home matches of A.S. Gubbio 1910 of the Lega Pro Prima Divisione.  The stadium has a capacity of 5,300 spectators.

A.S. Gubbio 1910
Football venues in Italy
Buildings and structures in Gubbio
Multi-purpose stadiums in Italy